Seyed Jalal Rafkhaei (born 24 April 1984) is an Iranian football player.

Club career statistics
He is a Malavan youth system product and played with the senior team for five years then transferred to Zob Ahan and after one season he returned to his hometown club. He became top scorer of 2012–13 season with 19 goals.

Last Update: 4 June 2019 

 Assist Goals

International career
In 2008, he was called for the Iran national football team by the Iran's coach Ali Daei. Rafkhaei debuted for Iran versus Palestine on August 7, 2008.

International goals
Scores and results list Iran's goal tally first.

Honours
Country
WAFF Championship
Winner (1): 2008

Individual
 Iran Pro League Top Goalscorer (19 goals): 2012–13
Iran Pro League Golden Boot (1): 2012–13

References

 Iran Premier League Stats

External links

1984 births
Living people
People from Bandar-e Anzali
Iranian footballers
Malavan players
Zob Ahan Esfahan F.C. players
Machine Sazi F.C. players
Khooneh be Khooneh players
Aluminium Arak players
Persian Gulf Pro League players
Azadegan League players
Association football forwards
Sportspeople from Gilan province